9G-Tronic is Mercedes-Benz's trademark name for its nine-speed automatic transmission, starting off with the W9A 700 (Wandler-9-Gang-Automatik bis 700 Nm Eingangsdrehmoment; converter-9-gear-automatic with 516 lb-ft (700 Nm) maximum input torque; type 725.0) as core model.

Abstract
In all applications this transmission is identified as the New Automatic Gearbox Generation Three, or NAG3. Initially it debuted on the E 350 blueTEC in 2013, before launched in the Mercedes-Benz S-Class (W222). It has been expanded to be used in the Mercedes-Benz C-Class (W205) and the sedan and wagon variants of the Mercedes-Benz E-Class (W213). This transmission was later introduced on Mercedes-Benz M-Class (W166) facelift on the GLE 250 d model. V12 engine models continue to use the older Mercedes-Benz 7G-Tronic transmission. By the end of 2018 unsurpassed ratio span among longitudinal automatic transmissions for passenger cars.

Development, production and licensing to Jatco Ltd
Development took place at the group's headquarters in Stuttgart-Untertuerkheim. Initially, the transmission was produced only at the Daimler plant not far away in Stuttgart-Hedelfingen. Since April 2016, the transmission has also been produced at Daimler's subsidiary Star Assembly in Romanian Sebeș. In 2019, the Jatco Ltd, based in Fuji, Shizuoka, Japan, started licensed production for use in Nissan and Infiniti vehicles. In this version, input torque is limited to 700 Nm, allowing each of the gearsets 1, 2, and 4 to use only three planetary gears. Slightly modified gear dimensions give it a spread of about 9.1.

Specifications

Basic concept
Technical and economic progress is reflected in 9 forward gears out of 10 main components, compared to 7 forward gears out of 11 main components in the direct predecessor. It is fully electronic controlled. Torque converter lock-up can operate in all 9 forward gears.

Gear ratios

Nomogram

▶️ Interactive Nomogram

This nomogram is a real geometric calculator exactly representing the rotational speeds of the transmission's 3x4 = 12 internal shafts for each of its 9 ratios (+ reverse), grouped according to their 4 permanent coupling on 3 joint ordinates and 5 independent ordinates. These ordinates are positioned on the abscissa in strict accordance with the proportions of the sun gears' teeth numbers relative to those of their rings. Consequently, the output ratios on the 3rd ordinate (carrier of the third planetary gearset) follows closely those of the actual transmission. This advantageous geometric construction sets us free from Willis' famous and tedious formula, because all calculations are exclusively determined by lengths ratios, respectively teeth numbers on the abscissa for the 4 epicyclic ratios, and of rotational speeds on the 3rd ordinate for the 10 gear ratios.

This nomogram reflects the version from 2013.

Legend:
A : Brake (blocks s2 sun gear)
B : Brake (blocks r3 ring gear)
C : Brake (blocks c1 carrier gear)
D : Clutch (couples c3 carrier gear with r4 ring gear)
E : Clutch (couples c1 carrier gear with r2 ring gear)
F : Clutch (couples s1 sun gear with c1 carrier gear)

AMG SpeedShift

AMG SpeedShift TCT
The TCT transmission is essentially the 9G-Tronic automatic transmission including "Torque Converter Technology".

AMG SpeedShift MCT
Mercedes-AMG developed the 9-speed MCT "Multi Clutch Technology" planetary automatic transmission.

The MCT transmission is essentially the 9G-Tronic automatic transmission without a torque converter. Instead of a torque converter, it uses a compact wet startup clutch to launch the car from a stop and also supports computer-controlled double-clutching. The MCT (Multi-Clutch Technology) acronym refers to a planetary (automatic) transmission's multiple clutches and bands for each gear.

The MCT is fitted with four drive modes: “C” (Comfort), “S” (Sport), “S+” (Sport plus) and “M” (Manual) and boasts 100 millisecond shifts in "M" and "S+" modes. MCT-equipped cars are also fitted with the new AMG DRIVE UNIT with an innovative Race Start function. The AMG DRIVE UNIT is the central control unit for the AMG SPEEDSHIFT MCT 9-speed sports transmission and all driving dynamics functions. The driver can change gears either using the selector lever or by nudging the steering-wheel shift paddles. The new Race start Function is a launch control system that enables the driver to call on maximum acceleration while ensuring optimum traction of the driven wheels.

The new GLC 63 4MATIC+ and GLC 63 S 4MATIC+ feature the AMG SPEEDSHIFT MCT 9-speed transmission, which made its debut in the Mercedes-AMG E 63 4MATIC+. The driver benefits from extremely short shift/response times. Fast multiple downshifts and the double-declutching function make for a highly emotive gearshift experience. A start-off wet clutch replaces the torque converter. This saves weight and optimises the response to the driver's accelerator pedal input, particularly during acceleration and load changes.

Applications

Mercedes models

Mercedes C-Class
 2019–2021 Mercedes-Benz W205 (all models)
 2022– Mercedes-Benz W206

Mercedes E-Class
 2014–2016 Mercedes-Benz W212 (E 350 BlueTec only) available as an option to others.
 2016–present Mercedes-Benz W213 (all models)

Mercedes S-Class
 2017–2021 Mercedes-Benz W222 (all except V12 models)
 2021– Mercedes-Benz W223

Mercedes V-Class
 2020–present V-Class (W447) (longitudinal engines)

Mercedes GLC-Class
 2015–present GLC

Mercedes-Benz GLE-Class
 2016–2019 GLE (W166) (except 63 AMG & 350 models)
 2020–present GLE (W167) (except 63 models)

Mercedes-Benz GLS-Class
 2017–2019 GLS (X166) (all except AMG)
 2020–present GLS (X167)

Mercedes-Benz SLK-Class
 2015–2020 SLC (R172) (except 55 AMG)

Mercedes-AMG models

Mercedes-AMG SL
 2022–present AMG SL (R232)

Jatco Ltd model JR913E

Nissan
 2020– Nissan Titan
 2020– Nissan Frontier
 2023– Nissan Z (RZ34)

Infiniti

Aston Martin
 2021– Aston Martin DBX V8 and Straight-Six
 2022– Aston Martin DBX707

See also
 List of Daimler AG transmissions

References

External links
Nine-Speed Automatic Transmission 9G-Tronic by Mercedes-Benz
Nomographs and Feasibility Graphs for Enumeration of Ravigneaux-Type Automatic Transmissions

Mercedes-Benz
Automatic transmission tradenames
Mercedes-Benz Group transmissions